Polona Juh (born June 2, 1971) is a Slovenian actress. She is the daughter of the Slovenian actors Mojca Ribič and Boris Juh. After finishing her studies at High School for Ballet, she entered to study acting at the Academy for Theatre, Radio, Film and Television, where she graduated. Since 1995, she is a permanent member of Slovenian National Theatre Drama in Ljubljana.

She had more than 50 different film and theatre roles so far, including many lead roles.

Notable theatre roles

 Hedwig in performance "The Wild Duck" by H. Ibsen
 Iphigeneia in performance "Iphigeneia in Tauris" by Euripides
 Hanako in performance "Hanjo - a play for classical Japanese theater" by Y. Mishima
 Aglaya in performance "The Idiot" by F.M. Dostoyevsky
 Miranda in performance "The Tempest" by W. Shakespeare
 Celimene in performance "The Misanthrope" by Molière
 Desdemona in performance "Othello" by W. Shakespeare
 Juliet in performance "Romeo and Juliet" by W. Shakespeare
 Masha in performance "The Seagull" by A.P. Chekov
 Natasha Ivanovna "Three Sisters" by A.P. Chekov
 Polly Peachum "The Threepenny opera" by B. Brecht
 Albertine "In search of Lost Time" by M. Proust
 Rosalind and the boy Ganymede in performance "As You Like It" by W. Shakespeare
 Agrafena Alexandrovna - Grushenka in performance "The Brothers Karamazov" by F.M. Dostoyevsky
 Anna Karenina in performance "Anna Karenina" by L.N. Tolstoy (2006)
 Dorine in performance "The Tartuffe" by J.B.P. Molière
 Ruth in performance "The Homecoming" by H. Pinter
 Clytemnestra in performance "The Oresteia" by Aeschylus
 Sofya Yegorovna in performance "Platonov" by A. P. Chekhov
 Elisabet Vogler in performance "Persona" by I. Bergman
 Sharlota, local starlet in performance "The Fall of Europe" by M. Zupančič
 Ophelia in performance "Hamlet" by W. Shakespeare
 Caesonia in performance "Caligula" by A. Camus
 Lady Anne in performance "Richard III + II" by W. Shakespeare, adaption Tomaž Pandur
 Frieda in performance "The Castle" by F. Kafka
 Margaret in performance "Faust" by J.W. Goethe, adaptation Tomaž Pandur
 Anna Karenina in performance "Anna Karenina" by L.N. Tolstoy, adaptation Dušan Jovanović (2016)
 Salome in performance "Salome" by O. Wilde

Filmography

 the role of Bazilika in Fuck it! (Jebiga) by Miha Hočevar
 the role of Duša in Beneath Her Window (Pod njenim oknom) by Metod Pevec
 the role of Sonja in Couples game by M. Zupanič
 the role of Hana in Good Night, Missy by M. Pevec
 the role of Nataša in Projections by Z. Ogresta
 the role of Sonja in Southern Scum Go Home by G. Vojnović

She regularly takes part in various radio plays; she was also a voice actor for several animated characters and advertisements.

Awards

For her work she received several awards at home and foreign countries:

 "Golden stick" - Theater Festival for Children, Slovenia, 1994
 "Stane Sever Fund for best actress", Slovenia, 1997
 "Golden bay's wreath for best actress" - Festival MESS, Sarajevo (Bosnia and Herzegovina), 2000
 "Golden laugh for best actress" - Days of Satire Festival, Zagreb (Croatia), 2000
 "France Prešeren Fund" - Slovene national award for artistic achievements, Slovenia, 2002
 "Vesna for best actress" - Slovene National Film Festival, Slovenia, 2003
 "Actress of the year" - Slovene National Film Festival, Slovenia, 2003
 "Silver George for best actress" - Moscow International Film Festival, Russia, 2005
 "Borštnik's award for best actress" - National Theater Festival, Slovenia, 2007
 "Župančič's award" - award for artistic achievements by City of Ljubljana, Slovenia, 2007
 "Borštnik's award for best actress" - National Theater Festival, Slovenia, 2009
 "Vesna for best actress" - Slovene National Film Festival, Slovenia, 2009
 "Golden Arena for best actress" - Pula Film Festival, Croatia, 2011
 "Borštnik's award for best actress" - National Theater Festival, Slovenia, 2013
 "Borštnik's award for best actress" - National Theater Festival, Slovenia, 2015

References

External links
 
 InterFilm
 Karlovy Vary International Film Festival
 Film Festival "Faces of Love", Moscow
 https://web.archive.org/web/20140106040942/http://www.emotionfilm.si/en/igralci/polona-juh.html
 https://web.archive.org/web/20070305014910/http://www.drama.si/ansambel/polona-juh.html

1971 births
Living people
Slovenian stage actresses
Slovenian film actresses
University of Ljubljana alumni
20th-century Slovenian actresses
Slovenian voice actresses